Charixa is a genus of bryozoans belonging to the family Electridae.

The species of this genus are found in Northern America.

Species:
 Charixa bispinata Martha, Taylor & Rader, 2019 
 Charixa burdonaria Taylor, Lazo & Aguirre-Urreta, 2008

References

Cheilostomatida